Kamila Konotop (born 23 March 2001, Kharkiv) is a Ukrainian weightlifter. She is a two-time medalist, including gold, at the European Weightlifting Championships. In 2021, she represented Ukraine at the 2020 Summer Olympics in Tokyo, Japan.

Career 

Konotop is from Kharkiv. In 2016, at the European Junior & U23 Weightlifting Championships held in Eilat, Israel, she won the bronze medal in the women's 53kg event. The following year, at the 2017 Youth World Weightlifting Championships in Bangkok, Thailand, she also won the bronze medal in the women's 53kg event. In 2018, she won the silver medal in the women's junior 53kg event at the European Junior & U23 Weightlifting Championships in Zamość, Poland. She also competed in the women's 55kg event at the 2018 World Weightlifting Championships in Ashgabat, Turkmenistan without winning a medal.

In 2019, she competed in the women's 55kg event at the World Weightlifting Championships held in Pattaya, Thailand. In that same year, she won the gold medal in the women's junior 55kg event at the European Junior & U23 Weightlifting Championships in Bucharest, Romania. At the 6th International Qatar Cup in Doha, Qatar, she won the silver medal in the women's 55kg event.

She won the silver medal in the women's 55kg event at the Roma 2020 World Cup in Rome, Italy. In April 2021, she secured the gold medal in her event at the European Weightlifting Championships held in Moscow, Russia. In May 2021, she also won the gold medal in her event at the Junior World Weightlifting Championships held in Tashkent, Uzbekistan. She also set a new junior world record of 212 kg.

In July 2021, she represented Ukraine at the 2020 Summer Olympics in Tokyo, Japan. She finished in 5th place in the women's 55kg event with a total result of 206 kg. At the 2021 European Junior & U23 Weightlifting Championships in Rovaniemi, Finland, she won the gold medal in her event with a total result of 209 kg.

She won the silver medal in her event at the 2022 European Weightlifting Championships held in Tirana, Albania. She won the gold medal in her event at the 2022 European Junior & U23 Weightlifting Championships held in Durrës, Albania. She won the bronze medal in the women's 59kg Snatch event at the 2022 World Weightlifting Championships held in Bogotá, Colombia.

Achievements

References

External links 

 

Living people
2001 births
Sportspeople from Kharkiv
Ukrainian female weightlifters
European Weightlifting Championships medalists
Weightlifters at the 2020 Summer Olympics
Olympic weightlifters of Ukraine
21st-century Ukrainian women